The 2011–12 Alaska Aces season was the 26th season of the franchise in the Philippine Basketball Association (PBA).

Key dates
August 28: The 2011 PBA Draft took place in Robinson's Place Ermita, Manila.

Draft picks

Roster

Philippine Cup

Eliminations

Standings

Commissioner's Cup

Eliminations

Standings

Bracket

Quarterfinals

Alaska–Barako Bull series

Governors Cup

Eliminations

Standings

Transactions

Trades

Pre-season

Governors Cup

Additions

Subtractions

Recruited imports

References

Alaska Aces (PBA) seasons
Alaska